Working Benevolent Temple and Professional Building is a historic office building located at Greenville, South Carolina. It was built in 1922, and is a three-story, steel frame brick building.  The building housed offices for African-American doctors, lawyers, dentists, a newspaper, and insurance firms and housed the first black mortuary in Greenville. The temple was also the center for Greenville's civil rights activities during the 1960s.

It was added to the National Register of Historic Places in 1982.

References

African-American history of South Carolina
Office buildings on the National Register of Historic Places in South Carolina
Commercial buildings completed in 1922
National Register of Historic Places in Greenville, South Carolina